Dartmouth may refer to:

Places
 Dartmouth, Devon, England
 Dartmouth Harbour
 Dartmouth, Massachusetts, United States
 Dartmouth, Nova Scotia, Canada
 Dartmouth, Victoria, Australia

Institutions
 Dartmouth College, Ivy League university in Hanover, New Hampshire, United States
Dartmouth Big Green, athletic teams representing the college
 The Dartmouth, a newspaper of Dartmouth College
 Dartmouth University, a defunct institution in New Hampshire
 University of Massachusetts Dartmouth, a university in Dartmouth, Massachusetts, United States
 Dartmouth–Hitchcock Medical Center, a research hospital in Lebanon, New Hampshire
 Britannia Royal Naval College or Dartmouth, a college in Dartmouth, Devon, England

Ships
 HMS Dartmouth (1655), a 22-gun ship
 HMS Dartmouth (1693), a 48-gun fourth rate
 HMS Dartmouth (1698), a 50-gun fourth rate
 HMS Dartmouth (1910), a Town-class cruiser of the Weymouth subgroup
Dartmouth, a ship that had its tea dumped into the Boston Harbor during the Boston Tea Party

Other uses
The Dartmouth (Indianapolis, Indiana), a historic apartment building

See also
 Earl of Dartmouth, a title in the Peerage of Great Britain
 HMS Dartmouth, a list of ships and a shore establishment of the Royal Navy
 Port of Dartmouth Royal Regatta
 RCAF Station Dartmouth, now CFB Shearwater, a Canadian military aerodrome